Erdeni Bumba (17th century), of the Khorchin Mongol Borjigit clan, was the consort of Fulin, the Shunzhi Emperor. She was empress consort of Qing-dynasty China from 1651 until her deposition in 1653. She was demoted to concubine rank and received title and honorary name Consort Jing.

Life

Family background
 Father: Wukeshan (d. 1666), held the title of a first rank prince
 Paternal grandfather: Jaisang, held the title of a first rank prince
Paternal grandmother: Boli
 Paternal great aunt: Empress Xiaoduanwen (1599–1649)
 Paternal aunt: Primary consort Minhui (1609–1641)
 Paternal aunt: Empress Dowager Zhaosheng (Xiaozhuangwen) (1613–1688), the mother of the Shunzhi Emperor (1638–1661)

Shunzhi era
Erdeni Bumba was selected by the emperor's mother, Empress Dowager Zhaosheng, to be the Shunzhi Emperor's primary consort. On 27 September 1651, she was instated as empress. The Prince-Regent Dorgon also encouraged the marriage between the Shunzhi Emperor and Erdeni Bumba. However, the Shunzhi Emperor disliked Erdeni Bumba so much that he demanded that she should be replaced. On 25 October 1653, Erdeni Bumba was demoted to "Consort Jing". Some sources claim, that when she was living in Palace of Eternal Longevity, she became pregnant. During her pregnancy, she left the Forbidden City and gave birth to a son. However, historical records don't mention her further fate.

Titles
 During the reign of Hong Taiji (r. 1626–1643):
 Lady Borjigit
 During the reign of the Shunzhi Emperor (r. 1643–1661):
 Empress (from 27 September 1651)
 Consort Jing (from 25 October 1653), fourth rank consort

In fiction and popular culture
 Portrayed by Lee Ying-tong in The Rise and Fall of Qing Dynasty (1987)
 Portrayed by Wu Zitong in Xiaozhuang Mishi (2003)
 Portrayed by Winnie Ma in The Life and Times of a Sentinel (2011)
 Portrayed by Viola Mi 米露 in Royal Romantic 多情江山 (2013)

See also
 List of people who disappeared
 Ranks of imperial consorts in China#Qing
 Royal and noble ranks of the Qing dynasty

Notes

References
 

17th-century births
17th-century Chinese women
17th-century Chinese people
17th-century deaths
17th-century Mongolian women
Borjigin
Missing person cases in Asia
Qing dynasty empresses
Year of birth unknown
Year of death unknown